HMS Looe was a 32-gun fifth rate built by Portsmouth Dockyard in 1696/97. She was first employed off the Irish coast. She went to Newfoundland in 1702. On her return she was wrecked on the Isle of Wight in December 1705.

She was the second vessel to bear the name Looe since it was used for a 32-gun fifth rate built at Plymouth in 1696 and wrecked in Baltimore Bay, Ireland on 30 April 1697.

Construction and Specifications
She was ordered on 24 December 1696 to be built at Portsmouth Dockyard under the guidance of Master Shipwright William Bagwell. She was launched on 15 October 1697. Her builder's measure tonnage was calculated as 389 tons (burthen).

The gun armament initially was four demi-culverins on the lower deck (LD) with two pair of guns per side. The upper deck (UD) battery would consist of between twenty and twenty-two 6-pounder guns with ten or eleven guns per side. The gun battery would be completed by four 4-pounder guns on the quarterdeck (QD) with two to three guns per side.

Commissioned Service 1697-1705
HMS Looe was commissioned in 1697 under Captain Robert Arris for service on the Irish coast. In Late 1702 she was under Captain Timothy Bridges for Captain John Leake's Squadron for a deployment to Newfoundland. The squadron sailed on 23 July from Plymouth arriving at the Bay of Bulls (St John's) on August 27th. There being no French vessels, he collect several small prizes. By the Enf of October he took twenty-nine ships, burnt two and demolished St Peter's Fort.

Loss
While returning with a homebound convoy she was wrecked in Scratchwell Bay on the Ilse of Wight on 12 December 1705. Eight member of her crew were drowned in the mishap.

Notes

Citations

References

 Winfield (2009), British Warships in the Age of Sail (1603 – 1714), by Rif Winfield, published by Seaforth Publishing, England © 2009, EPUB 
 Colledge (2020), Ships of the Royal Navy, by J.J. Colledge, revised and updated by Lt Cdr Ben Warlow and Steve Bush, published by Seaforth Publishing, Barnsley, Great Britain, © 2020, EPUB 
 Lavery (1989), The Arming and Fitting of English Ships of War 1600 - 1815, by Brian Lavery, published by US Naval Institute Press © Brian Lavery 1989, Part V Guns, Type of Guns
 Clowes (1898), The Royal Navy, A History from the Earliest Times to the Present (Vol. II). London. England: Sampson Low, Marston & Company, © 1898

 

Frigates of the Royal Navy
Ships of the Royal Navy
1690s ships